Kari Övermark (born 2 August 1956) is a Finnish wrestler. He competed in the men's freestyle 68 kg at the 1976 Summer Olympics.

References

External links
 

1956 births
Living people
Finnish male sport wrestlers
Olympic wrestlers of Finland
Wrestlers at the 1976 Summer Olympics
People from Lappajärvi
Sportspeople from South Ostrobothnia